Ernakulam Duronto Express is a weekly Durunto Express which runs between Kochi, and the national capital New Delhi.
It is the longest running Durunto Express in India. It runs through the scenic Konkan Railway. This is the first Duronto express to Kerala and the longest running Duronto express in Indian Railways.

Background 
This weekly service is supplied with LHB rake having 7 non-AC three -tier sleeper coaches, 4 AC three-tier coaches, 1 AC two-tier coaches, 1 AC first-class, 1 pantry car and 2 EOG cars making a total of 16 coaches runs approximately 44 hours for one-way journey.

Routeing
It has halts at Ernakulam Junction, Kozhikode, Mangaluru Junction, Madgaon Junction, Ratnagiri, Panvel Junction, Vasai Road, Surat railway station,

Traction

The train is hauled by Ghaziabad-based WAP7 or WAP5 up to Vadodara and from there it get Ernakulam based WDM-3A up to Mangaluru handing over Erode based WAP-7 towards the remaining part of the journey till Ernakulam.

Gallery
Few snippets of this Superfast Express train:-

References

Transport in Kochi
Transport in Delhi
Duronto Express trains
Rail transport in Kerala
Rail transport in Goa
Rail transport in Maharashtra
Rail transport in Delhi
Rail transport in Madhya Pradesh
Rail transport in Gujarat
Rail transport in Rajasthan
Railway services introduced in 2010